The Haunted Man and the Ghost's Bargain, A Fancy for Christmas-Time (better known as The Haunted Man and the Ghost's Bargain or simply as The Haunted Man) is a novella by Charles Dickens first published in 1848. It is the fifth and last of Dickens's Christmas novellas. The story is more about the spirit of Christmas than about the holiday itself, harking back to the first in the series, A Christmas Carol. The tale centres on a Professor Redlaw and those close to him.

Plot summary

The Gift Bestowed
Redlaw is a teacher of chemistry who often broods over wrongs done him and grief from his past. He is attended to by his servants William Swidger; Swidger's 87-year-old father; and Swidger's wife Milly, who serves as cook and who, with the father, helps decorate Redlaw's rooms with holly.

He is haunted by a spirit, who is not so much a ghost as Redlaw's phantom twin and is "an awful likeness of himself...with his features, and his bright eyes, and his grizzled hair, and dressed in the gloomy shadow of his dress..." This Ghost appears and proposes to Redlaw that he can allow him to "forget the sorrow, wrong, and trouble you have known...to cancel their remembrance..." The Ghost also promises that Redlaw will have the power to bestow this same gift on anyone he meets. Redlaw is hesitant at first, but finally agrees.

After the Ghost bestows his gift, a child dressed in rags with no shoes appears in Redlaw's house. He seems terrified of Redlaw but becomes his unwilling companion.

The Gift Diffused
The Tetterbys live in their shop, which has been all manner of unsuccessful businesses in the past. They have many children and are quite poor. Mrs. Tetterby comes home from marketing and confesses her deep shame that she fantasized about never having married Mr. Tetterby when she saw all the things she could not afford.

Redlaw has followed her inside the house and startles the couple. He inquires after their boarder, Mr. Denham, who is one of his students. Denham has been severely ill. Redlaw visits with him and bestows his gift of forgetting all that Denham has suffered. When Milly arrives to tend to Denham, Redlaw has started to realize that his gift is more of a curse. He begs Denham to help him hide so that he does not curse Milly with forgetting her woes.

Denham is rude and dismissive of Milly, who has been his faithful nurse over the course of his illness. Redlaw is now horrified by how transformed people are when they forget the pain in their lives.

He pays the mysterious child to take him to the Swidgers. With no pockets to keep his coins in, the child puts them in his mouth. At the Swidgers' lodgings, Redlaw bestows his gift. The 87-year old patriarch goes from doting on his eldest son who is suffering from a fatal illness to not recognizing him at all.

The Gift Reversed
Redlaw is disgusted with all the misery he has caused by making people forget. He begs the Ghost to remove the gift from everyone he has infected, even if it means that Redlaw will remain forgetful. The Ghost explains that the barefooted child is the embodiment of Redlaw's curse of forgetfulness. When mankind cannot remember its sorrows, it becomes insensate and feral. The child is an example of what indifference reaps.

Redlaw takes pity on the child and covers him as he sleeps. The curse is lifted, and all of the characters' memories are restored. Denham apologizes to Milly for being so dreadfully ungrateful.

Redlaw realizes that "Christmas is a time in which, of all times in the year, the memory of every remediable sorrow, wrong, and trouble in the world around us, should be active with us," and he makes peace with his painful memories.

Performances 
In what would be the first public performance of the technique known as Pepper's ghost, John Henry Pepper staged a Christmas Eve production of the play in 1862 at the Royal Polytechnic Institution (currently known as the University of Westminster) in 309 Regent Street. It was very well received, if only for the new apparatus's ability to project a ghost so as to look as though it is interacting with those on stage.

See also
 List of Christmas-themed literature

References

External links 

Online editions
 The Haunted Man and the Ghost’s Bargain at Internet Archive.
 
 

1848 British novels
1840s fantasy novels
British novels adapted into plays
Christmas characters
Christmas novels
English novels
Ghost novels
Ghosts in written fiction
Novels by Charles Dickens